Pete Campos is an American politician and educator serving as a Democratic member of the New Mexico Senate, representing the 8th District since 1991. Campos also serves as President of Luna Community College in Las Vegas, New Mexico.

Campos previously served as Mayor of Santa Rosa, New Mexico, which serves as the county seat for Guadalupe County, from 1986 until he was elected to the New Mexico Senate in 1990.

References

External links
Senator Pete Campos at the NM Senate website
Project Vote Smart - Senator Pete Campos (NM) profile
Follow the Money - Pete Campos
2008 2006 2004 2002 2000 1996 1992 campaign contributions

Hispanic and Latino American state legislators in New Mexico
Democratic Party New Mexico state senators
1954 births
Living people
21st-century American politicians